Roy Charles Forbes (born February 13, 1953) is a Canadian folk music singer-songwriter, whose music bears heavy influences from classic American genres of acoustic blues and traditional country.  Forbes is known for his high soulful voice and percussive guitar playing.

Early life and education
Forbes was born and grew up in Dawson Creek, British Columbia. He learned to play guitar at age 14, and had the childhood nickname, "Bim".

Career

Forbes, calling himself "Bim," began his musical career in Vancouver in 1971 after winning a "Battle of the Bands" competition in Dawson Creek. Initially, he appeared as the opening act for such groups as Supertramp and Santana, but soon came to headline and sell out his own shows. His song "Can't Catch Me", from his first LP Kid Full of Dreams, was released as a single and hit the Top 10 in several major Canadian markets. His third LP "Thistles" was produced by Emitt Rhodes and featured Mac Cridlin, David Foster, Bob Glaub, Penny Nichols, Jeff Porcaro, Ron Tutt, Blue Williams and Jai Winding. Forbes has appeared as a headliner in most of Canada's major folk music festivals. In 1984, he toured in the US with fellow Canadian Ferron, with whom he performed a duet on the song "Proud Crowd/Pride Cried" for her album, Shadows on a Dime. In 1987, he began performing and recording as Roy Forbes.

He is also a member of the supergroup UHF, together with Shari Ulrich and Bill Henderson.

Songs written by Forbes have been recorded by Sylvia Tyson, Garnet Rogers, Valdy, and Susan Jacks.

Since 2006, Forbes has hosted a weekly radio program called "Roy's Record Room" on the CKUA Radio Network in Alberta. He previously hosted a program known as "Snap Crackle Pop" on CBC Radio across Canada from 1996 to 2009. Both programs feature songs taken from his extensive collection of vintage records.

Discography

as Bim
 Kid Full of Dreams (1975) (#72 Canada)
 Raincheck on Misery (1976) (#59 Canada)
 Thistles (1978)
 Anything You Want (1982)
 New Songs for an Old Celebration with Connie Kaldor (1985)

as Roy Forbes
 Love Turns to Ice (1987)
 The Human Kind (1992)
 Almost Overnight (1995)
 Crazy Old Moon (1998)
 Some Tunes For That Mother Of Mine (2006)
 Strikin' Matches – LIVE! (2014)
 Edge of Blue (2020)

with UHF
 UHF (1990)
 UHF II (1994)

References

External links
Roy Forbes
CanConRox entry
 
 
 

1953 births
Canadian folk singer-songwriters
Canadian male singer-songwriters
Musicians from British Columbia
Living people
People from Dawson Creek
20th-century Canadian male singers
21st-century Canadian male singers